Robert Owen Academy was a secondary school in Hereford, Herefordshire, England.

It opened in September 2013. It was formed a specialist school within the Vocational area, the current site of the academy was opened in 2014, previously the group had a site not far away from their current in an area called Holme Lacy but after a £3 million renovation on a £1 million patch of land the academy opened up their new site.

After poor results the school closed in August 2018.

References

Defunct schools in Herefordshire
Defunct free schools in England
Educational institutions established in 2013
2013 establishments in England
Educational institutions disestablished in 2018
2018 disestablishments in England